Asharam Dalichand Shah (8 February 1842 ― 26 March 1921) was Gujarati language writer who pioneered the research in Gujarati proverbs and idioms.

Biography

Asharam was born on 8 February 1842 and died on 26 March 1921. He had served as the administrator of the several princely states of Kathiawar.

Works
He published Gujarati Kahevat Sangraha (A Collection of Gujarati Proverbs) in 1911. It contained proverbs and idioms along with their versions, origin, use in different parts of Gujarat and circumstances or incidents which resulted in their origin. It also presented the transformation of proverb if it is originated from Sanskrit. He has also compared corresponding Hindi and Marathi proverbs.

His son Mulchand had written his biography, Asharam Dalichand Shah ane Temno Samay (1934).

Bibliography

See also 
 List of Gujarati-language writers

References

External links 
 

20th-century Indian linguists
Gujarati-language writers
1842 births
1921 deaths
Writers from Gujarat
19th-century Indian linguists
19th-century Indian politicians